Calytrix simplex is a species of plant in the myrtle family Myrtaceae that is endemic to Western Australia.

It usually blooms between October and December producing purple star-shaped flowers.

Found on ridges and sand plains in a scattered area from the Swan Coastal Plain extending inland into the Wheatbelt where it grows in sandy lateritic soils.

There are two known subspecies:
 Calytrix simplex subsp. simplex
 Calytrix simplex subsp. suboppositifolia

References

Plants described in 1839
simplex
Flora of Western Australia